The Windsor Witches was the common name for a witch trial in Windsor and Abingdon in England in 1579. The name referred to the four women trialed and executed for sorcery: the cunning woman Mother Elizabeth Stile, Mother Devell, Mother Dutten and Mother Margaret.

Elizabeth Stile, a local cunning woman who performed curses for money, was the first to be accused. She pointed out three accomplices, and confessed that they had murdered several people by use of magic, and that they owned familials and had the ability to transform into animals.

The trial was the subject of the famous contemporary pamphlet A Rehearsal both Strange and True, 1579. The trial belonged to the first English witch trials to enjoy fame through contemporary press.

References

 Margaret Alice Murray, The Witch-cult in Western Europe A Study in Anthropology
 Instruments of Darkness: Witchcraft in England 1550–1750. J. A. Sharpe · 1997

People executed for witchcraft
1579 in law
16th century in England
1579 in England
16th-century trials
Witch trials in England